Czesławice  is a village in the administrative district of Gmina Ciepłowody, within Ząbkowice Śląskie County, Lower Silesian Voivodeship, in south-western Poland.

Climate
This area has few extremes of temperature and ample precipitation in all months. The Köppen Climate Classification subtype for this climate is "Cfb". (Marine West Coast Climate).

References

Villages in Ząbkowice Śląskie County